Hans Martin (born in Vaasa, Finland in 1946) is a Finnish-Swedish singer, with a long repertoire of dansband music. For the period 1986 to 2000, he was also the solo vocalist for the dansband group Tommys. As a solo artist, he has scored chart successes in Norway and Sweden.

Solo discography

Albums

References

External links
Official website

20th-century Finnish male singers
Swedish-speaking Finns
1950 births
Living people
Dansband singers
People from Vaasa